Sebastián Fernando Sánchez (born 20 September 1988) is an Argentine professional footballer who plays as a centre-back for Italian Serie D club Casarano.

Career
Sánchez's career began with Luján de Cuyo in 2005, featuring in twenty Torneo Argentino A matches in two years. In 2009, Sánchez moved to Mendoza's Gimnasia y Esgrima. Twelve appearances followed as the club were relegated to Torneo Argentino B in 2008–09; he netted two goals across three years in the fourth tier. On 4 July 2012, Sportivo Desamparados signed Sánchez. In 2013, Sánchez moved up to Primera B Nacional with Gimnasia y Esgrima of San Salvador de Jujuy. He made his pro bow on 17 September versus Unión Santa Fe, with his first goal coming in November during a 1–1 draw against Defensa y Justicia.

After three goals and fifty-two matches for Gimnasia y Esgrima, Sánchez departed to play for Primera División side Atlético de Rafaela in January 2015. He participated in four fixtures in the top-flight, before sealing a return to Gimnasia y Esgrima (J) in early 2016.

In September 2020, Sánchez joined Kuwaiti club Khaitan SC. A year later, in August 2021, Sánchez signed with Italian Serie D club Casarano.

Career statistics
.

References

External links

1988 births
Living people
Argentine footballers
Argentine expatriate footballers
Sportspeople from Mendoza, Argentina
Association football defenders
Torneo Argentino A players
Torneo Argentino B players
Primera Nacional players
Serie D players
Argentine Primera División players
Asociación Atlética Luján de Cuyo players
Gimnasia y Esgrima de Mendoza footballers
Sportivo Desamparados footballers
Gimnasia y Esgrima de Jujuy footballers
Atlético de Rafaela footballers
Khaitan SC players
Argentine expatriate sportspeople in Kuwait
Argentine expatriate sportspeople in Italy
Expatriate footballers in Kuwait
Expatriate footballers in Italy